A shithole is a profane term for a dirty or dysfunctional place.  Shithole may also refer to:

Shithole, a song by Les Turds on the compilation album Play at Your Own Risk, Volume 2
Shit Hole, a song on the 2005 film score album Saw II
The Shithole, a spoken word piece on the 2006 album Boned!
Shithole, a 2016 song by Canadian band Weaves

See also
 "Shithole countries", a comment made by Donald Trump in 2018
 Shit
 Shit (disambiguation)